Archuleta County is a county located in the U.S. state of Colorado. As of the 2020 census, the population was 13,359.  The county seat and the only incorporated municipality in the county is Pagosa Springs.

History
Archuleta County was created by the Colorado legislature on April 14, 1885, out of western Conejos County. It was named for Jose Manuel Archuleta, "head of one of the old Spanish families of New Mexico", and in honor of his son Antonio D. Archuleta, who was the Senator from Conejos County at the time.

Geography

Adjacent counties
Mineral County, Colorado - north
Rio Grande County, Colorado - northeast
Conejos County, Colorado - east
Rio Arriba County, New Mexico - south
San Juan County, New Mexico - southwest
La Plata County, Colorado - west
Hinsdale County, Colorado - northwest

Airport 

 Stevens Field

Major Highways
  U.S. Highway 84
  U.S. Highway 160
  State Highway 17
  State Highway 151

National protected areas
Rio Grande National Forest
San Juan National Forest
Chimney Rock National Monument
South San Juan Wilderness

State protected area
Navajo State Park

Scenic and historic trails
Continental Divide National Scenic Trail
Old Spanish National Historic Trail

Waterways 

 Chamita River
 Dutton Creek
 Little Navajo River
 Martinez Creek
 McCabe Creek
 Mill Creek
 Piedra River
 Rio Blanco
 Rio Chama
 San Juan River
 Stollsteimer Creek 
 Williams Creek

Demographics
According to the 2020 census, there were 13,359 people, 5,736 households living in the county. The average household size was 2.34 persons. The racial makeup of the county was 90.9% White, 0.9% Black or African American, 3.8% Native American, 1.2% Asian, 0.2% Pacific Islander, and 3.1% from two or more races. 18.5% of the population were Hispanic or Latino of any race.

The age distribution was 4.1% under 5 years, 17.5% under 18 years, 51.1% between 18 and 64 years, and 27.3% 65 years or older. 49.9% were female.

The median household income (in 2020 dollars) was $55,658. The per capita income for the county was $32,995. About 9.40% of the population were at or below the poverty line.

Politics
As of January 2022, Archuleta County had approximately 10,696 active registered voters. There were 40.6% unaffiliated with a party, 38.3% Republican, 19.6% Democrat, .8% Libertarian, .2% Green, and .5% various other parties.

Voting in the county tends to favor conservative choices, especially at the state and national level, but winning elections for unaffiliated local candidates are not uncommon.

Communities

Town
Pagosa Springs

Census-designated place
Arboles

Other unincorporated places
Chimney Rock
Chromo
Juanita
Dyke
Apparently named for the first county sheriff (circa 1890) and later county commissioner, Wm. Dyke.  It can be found listed on USGS and FAA maps.

Education
School districts include:
 Archuleta County School District 50-JT
 Bayfield School District 10 JT-R
 Ignacio School District 11-JT

See also
Outline of Colorado
Index of Colorado-related articles
Colorado census statistical areas
National Register of Historic Places listings in Archuleta County, Colorado

References

External links
Archuleta County Government website
Colorado County Evolution by Don Stanwyck
Colorado Historical Society

 

 
1885 establishments in Colorado
Populated places established in 1885
Colorado counties